Catocala sponsalis is a moth of the family Erebidae. It is found in Nepal, China (Hubei) and northern Laos.

References

External links
Japanese moths

sponsalis
Moths described in 1858
Moths of Asia